Leimonis erratica is a species of crustose lichen in the family Pilocarpaceae. A widely distributed species that grows on siliceous rock, it is found in Asia, Australia, North America, and Réunion.

Taxonomy
The lichen was originally described in 1861 by German lichenologist Gustav Wilhelm Körber as a member of genus Lecidea. In 2009, Richard Harris and James Lendemer transferred it to the new genus Leimonis, in which it is the type species.

References

Pilocarpaceae
Lichen species
Lichens described in 1861
Lichens of Asia
Lichens of Australasia
Lichens of North America
Lichens of Réunion
Taxa named by Gustav Wilhelm Körber